Real España Las Vegas is a Honduran soccer club, based in San Pedro Sula, Honduras.

They are Real España's reserve or "B" team. They have played in the Honduran 2nd division until 2008/2009.

References

Football clubs in Honduras